Route 950 is a Canadian highway in Westmorland County, New Brunswick.

The 22 kilometre road runs from an intersection with Route 15 at Cap-Pelé, to an intersection with Route 15 to the east in Shemogue.

Communities along Route 950
Cap-Pelé
Bas-Cap-Pelé
Trois-Ruisseaux
Petit-Cap
Shemogue

See also
List of New Brunswick provincial highways

References

New Brunswick provincial highways
Roads in Westmorland County, New Brunswick